Luca Campigotto (born February 23, 1962) is an Italian artist photographer and writer.

He was born in Venice, where he graduated in modern history. He is known for his images on night citiescapes and wild landscapes. Among his city series are Venice, New York, Chicago, Cairo, Morocco, Angkor, India, Iran, Patagonia, Easter Island, Yemen, and Lapland.

Books 
 L'ora blu, Fondazione Capri, 2019
 Matera, Opera Edizioni, San Benedetto del Tronto, 2019
 Disoriente, Postcart Edizioni, Rome, 2018
 Venezia, storie d'acqua, texts by Tiziano Scarpa, Silvana Editoriale, Milan, 2018
 Iconic China, texts by W. M. Hunt, Damiani, Bologna, 2017
 Le règles de la vision, texts by François Hébel and Walter Guadagnini, Italian Cultural Institute, Paris 2016
 ROMA. Un impero alle radici dell'Europa, texts by Louis Godart and Livio Zerbini, Silvana Editoriale, Milan 2015
 Theatres of War, texts by Lyle Rexer, Mario Isnenghi, Marco Meneguzzo, Gustavo Pietropolli Charmet, Silvana, Milan 2014
 Gotham City, text by Marvin Heiferman, Damiani, Bologna 2012
 50+1, text by Domenico De Masi, Alinari 24 Ore, Milan 2012
 My Wild Places, text by Walter Guadagnini, Hatje Cantz, Ostfildern 2010
 The Stones of Cairo, text by Achille Bonito Oliva, Peliti Associati, Roma 2007
 Venicexposed, text by Henry James, Contrasto, Rome/Thames & Hudson, London/La Martinière, Paris 2006
 L’Arsenale di Venezia, text by Gino Benzoni, Marsilio, Venice 2000
 Molino Stucky, Marsilio, text by Massimo Cacciari, Venice 1998
 Venetia Obscura, text by Gino Benzoni, Peliti Associati, Roma/Dewi Lewis, Stockport/Marval, Paris 1995

Essays 

 Al-Qāhirah: Luca Campigotto in Egitto, by Flaminio Gualdoni, FMR nr.17 2007
 Fotografare significa trattenere il respiro, by Achille Bonito Oliva, Obiettivo Napoli, Electa, Naples 2005
 L'immagine fotografica in Italia, by Uliano Lucas e Tatiana Agliani, Storia d'Italia, Annali 20, Einaudi, Turin 2004
 Indugiare sul mondo con compassione, Abitare, nr. 455, 2005
 Fotologia nr. 20, edited Italo Zannier, Fratelli Alinari, Firenze 1999
 Luca Campigotto, edited by Francesca Fabiani, Fotografia-Le collezioni, MAXXI Architettura, Electa, Rome 2010
 The impossibility of forgetting, by Gustavo Pietropolli Charmet Fuori di casa, Imagina, Venice 1998
 VenicExposed, by Harvey Goldstein, Rangefinder Magazine, January 2007

Exhibitions 
 Iconic China, Palazzo Zen, Venice 2017
 The Empire of the Night, Bugno Art Gallery, Venice 2016
 Theatres of War - Teatri di guerra, Doge's Palace, Venice - Museo del Vittoriano, Rome 2014
 Gotham and Beyond, Laurence Miller Gallery, New York, 2013
 My Wild Places, Fortuny Palace, Venice 2010-11
 Landscapes as Memory, Bugno Art Gallery, Venice 2009
 Collective shows: Mois de la Photo, Paris 2006; CCA, Montreal 1998; The Art Museum, Miami 1999; The Warehouse, Miami 2008; MAXXI, Rome 2010; 47' Venice Biennale 1997; 54' Venice Biennale 2011; Festival della Fotografia, Rome 2006, 2007; MEP, Paris 2007; Galleria Gottardo, Lugano 1998; IVAM, Valencia 2003 .

Collections 
 Maison Européenne de la Photographie, Paris
 Canadian Centre for Architecture, Montreal
 The Progressive Collection, Cleveland
 The Margulies Collection at the Warehouse, Miami
 The Sagamore Collection, Miami
 UniCredit Group Collection, Milan
 Fondazione Sandretto Re Rebaudengo, Turin
 Fondazione Cassa di Risparmio di Modena, Modena 
 Metropolitana, Naples
 Palazzo Fortuny, Venice

References 

 
 
 
 
 
 
 
 
 
 
 

1962 births
Italian photographers
Italian contemporary artists
Living people
Artists from Venice